The Tampa Bay Inferno is a team of the Women's Football Alliance that began play for the 2012 season and is based in Tampa, Florida.  Home games are played at Sickles High School.

Season-by-season

|-
| colspan="6" align="center" | Tampa Bay Pirates (WFA)
|-
|2010 || 4 || 4 || 0 || 3rd National South Central || –
|-
|2011 || 2 || 6 || 0 || 3rd National Coastal || –
|-
| colspan="6" align="center" | Tampa Bay Inferno (WFA)
|-
|2012* || 7 || 1 || 0 || 2nd WFA National 9 || –
|-
|2013 ||5|| 3 || 0 ||   || –
|-
|2014 || 7 || 1 || 0 || Nat'l Conference South Atlantic Division Champions  || 0–1
|-
|2015 || 5 || 3 || 0 ||  || –
|-
|2016 || 8 || 0 || 0 || Nat'l Conference South Atlantic Division Champions, Nat'l Conference Div II Champions ||2–1
|-
!Totals || 39 || 18 || 0
|colspan="2"|

2010

Season schedule

2011

Standings

Season schedule

2012

Season schedule

2013

Season schedule

2014

Season schedule

Postseason Games

2015

Season schedule

2016

Season schedule

Postseason Games

External links 
Tampa Bay Inferno website
Women's Football Alliance website

Women's Football Alliance teams
American football teams in Florida
American football teams in Tampa, Florida
American football teams established in 2010
2010 establishments in Florida
Women's sports in Florida